Arthropleidae is a family of flatheaded mayflies in the order Ephemeroptera. There are at least two genera, one of which is extinct, in Arthropleidae.

Genera
These two genera belong to the family Arthropleidae:
 Arthroplea Bengtsson, 1908
 † Electrogenia Demoulin, 1956

References

Further reading

 
 
 
 

Mayflies
Articles created by Qbugbot